The Tanga Island Rear Range Lighthouse is located in the northeastern city of Tanga in Tanzania.

See also

 List of lighthouses in Tanzania

References

External links
 Tanzania Ports Authority

Lighthouses in Tanzania
Buildings and structures in Tanga, Tanzania